Twistee Treat is a corporate owned chain of ice cream restaurants, founded in 1983 in North Fort Myers, Florida. The restaurants are characterized by buildings shaped in the form of soft-serve ice cream cones.
The company is currently expanding throughout the Orlando and Tampa markets, building new stores.  Corporate stores are marked with a chocolate dip and LED colored "sprinkles" on the roof of the cone.

History

The original Twistee Treat was a franchised chain of ice cream restaurants, founded in 1983 in North Fort Myers, Florida. The restaurants are characterized by buildings shaped in the form of soft-serve ice cream cones.

The original company, which had 23 locations in Florida, went into bankruptcy in the early-1990s. A new Twistee Treat company, based in Orlando, Florida, was formed in 1996. As of 1999, the new company had 35 locations in Florida and Missouri. The company also sold a franchise to a Chatham, Ontario-based company that year.  
 
In 2010 a new company, Twistee Treat USA began building new stores.

Bankruptcy and original franchises
When the original and subsequently the second parent company for Twistee Treat ceased operations, the rights to the name and building were handed over to the individual franchisees.

Twistee Treat USA
In 2010 Twistee Treat USA acquired the patents and rights to the company.  They began building new stores under the Twistee Treat name, utilizing old buildings purchased from previous franchisees.  A new building design was also created and will be used for future company expansion.

Existing stores owned by previous franchisees
While all new Twistee Treat stores are corporate owned, several privately owned stores from the previous corporations still operate around the US.  These currently existing stores were granted the rights to use the name and building design, and are allowed to operate as they are. The menu items at privately owned stores can differ from corporate outlets, for example in lacking the famous brownie boat.  New buildings under the Twistee Treat banner are corporate owned.

References

Further reading

External links 
 
 Twistee Treat to develop Twistee Treat stores with Metro Treat Inc.
 Twistee Treat Corporation filings with the United States Securities and Exchange Commission

Restaurants established in 1983
Companies based in Missouri
Ice cream parlors in the United States
Restaurants in Florida